Guillaume Boutheroue was a French engineer who completed the Briare Canal, originated by Hugues Cosnier.

In 1623, he was the Poor Rate and Tax Collector at Beaugency.

In 1638, along with his brother-in-law Jacques Guyon, he obtained letters patent from Louis XIII allowing them to complete the Canal de Briare. The canal was completed in 1642.

See also
 Briare Canal
 Hugues Cosnier

References 

French canal engineers
Year of death unknown
Year of birth unknown